Pingasa nigrolineata is a moth of the family Geometridae which is endemic to Cameroon. The species was first described by Timm Karisch in 2006.

References

External links

Endemic fauna of Cameroon
Moths described in 2006
Pseudoterpnini
Insects of Cameroon
Moths of Africa